Miguel Brascó (14 September 1926 – 10 May 2014) was an Argentine writer, poet and translator, humorist, cartoonist, editor, critic who is a specialist in wine and gourmet food. From Sastre, Santa Fe, he was also a lawyer and journalist of long standing, and a keen observer of Argentine affairs.

References

External links
 Brascó a Documentary

Argentine male poets
Argentine translators
Argentine cartoonists
20th-century Argentine lawyers
Argentine journalists
Male journalists
Argentine critics
Wine critics
Food writers
1926 births
2014 deaths
People from San Martín Department, Santa Fe
Argentine humorists
20th-century Argentine poets
20th-century Argentine male writers
20th-century translators